Al-Qaum was the Nabataean god of war and the night, and guardian of caravans.

Large numbers of inscriptions bearing his name have been found, and archaeologists believe that he was a major god of the Nabataean pantheon.

In popular culture
A black metal band in Saudi Arabia, Al-Namrood, uses this pantheon as inspiration for its music.

Al-Qaum is the name of one of the Exodan fleet spaceships in the 2018 novel Record of a Spaceborn Few by Becky Chambers.

References

Arabian gods
War gods
Night gods
Nabataea